Svendborgsund is a strait that separates Funen from Tåsinge. In the west it flows into the South Funen Archipelago by the island Skarø, and in the east it ends in Thurø Sund and Skårupøre Sund, almost separated by Thurøbro, which is mostly a dam.

References

See also
Geography of Denmark

Straits of Denmark
Straits of the Baltic Sea